Ames/ISU Ice Arena is an ice arena and recreational sport facility located in Ames, Iowa and owned and operated by Ames Parks & Rec Department and Iowa State University. The Ames / ISU Ice Arena is home to the Iowa State University Cyclones Men’s and Women's Hockey Teams, ISU Synchronized Skating Team. The ISU Men's Hockey Team competes at the ACHA Division I level in the Central States Collegiate Hockey League, in addition an auxiliary team competes at the ACHA D II level as members of the North Central Collegiate Hockey Association. ISU Women's Hockey competes as an independent team in the ACHA Women's Division II level.

In addition the arena is used by several local high school ice hockey teams(including the hosting of the MHSHL Championship Tournament each spring), youth, and adult rec. ice hockey leagues, Ames Figure Skating Club, and Iowa State intramural activities, as well as public skating.

Facility
The City of Ames and Iowa State University jointly constructed the facility, which opened in 2001. It features an NHL regulation ice sheet for ice hockey, figure skating and open skating, and local high school hockey .  The arena is equipped with eight locker rooms, two of which are designated to ISU, officials and other programs. The current capacity for spectators is about 1,000. The arena was built to allow for possible expansion.

References

External links
Ice Arena website
ISU Men's Homepage
ISU Women's Homepage
Synchronized Skating Club
ISU Men's ACHA DII team
Iowa State

Iowa State Cyclones facilities
Indoor arenas in Iowa
Indoor ice hockey venues in the United States
College ice hockey venues in the United States